Alternate Warriors is an alternate history anthology edited by Mike Resnick, published in the United States by Tor Books. The anthology contains 29 short stories, including Resnick's own "Mwalimu in the Squared Circle". The other stories are by different authors, and present scenarios where famous peacemakers are instead warriors in a way that did not occur in real life. The anthology was released on September 1, 1993.

Stories

Reviews
Review by Mark R. Kelly (1993) in Locus, #394 November 1993
Review by Leigh Grossman (1994) in Horror #1, January 1994

See also
 List of works by Mike Resnick

References

External links
Internet Book List entry

1993 books
Alternate history anthologies
Tor Books books
Cultural depictions of Susan B. Anthony
Cultural depictions of Albert Einstein
Cultural depictions of Mahatma Gandhi
Cultural depictions of Adolf Hitler
Cultural depictions of J. Edgar Hoover
Cultural depictions of Martin Luther King Jr.
Cultural depictions of Moses
Cultural depictions of Mark Twain